The 1951 Western Illinois Leathernecks football team was an American football team that represented Western Illinois University as a member of the Interstate Intercollegiate Athletic Conference (IIAC) during the 1951 college football season. Led by third-year head coach Vince DiFrancesca, the Leathernecks compiled an overall record of 7–1–1 with a mark of 4–1–1 in conference play, placing second in the IIAC.

Schedule

References

Western Illinois
Western Illinois Leathernecks football seasons
Western Illinois Leathernecks football